Kahe Diya Pardes is an Indian bilingual Marathi and Hindi television series broadcast on Zee Marathi.

Plot
Shiv Shukla, is a kind-hearted North Indian, comes to Mumbai post his promotion. He becomes neighbor to Gauri, a sweet Maharashtrian girl. He falls in love with her, but does not confess. Gauri's father is attached to Marathi language. He later befriends Shiv due to his kind gestures. Later, Gauri also falls in love with Shiv and both confess their feelings, but don't disclose it due to cultural differences. Shiv's parents comes to Mumbai to look after him. Shiv's father learns about it and accepts his relationship but his mother is against it. Shiv and Gauri disclose their relationship to their families. Due to cultural differences, their families try to separate them, but they win against all odds. Shiv, Gauri and family goes to Varanasi to seek permission from Shiv's grandmother who accepts Gauri for her kind nature. Later, Shiv and Gauri finally tie the knot and goes to Varanasi after marriage. Gauri faces difficulty to adjust amongst old-fashioned customs. Due to her inability to get used to North Indian cultures, Shiv's grandmother asks her to get comfortable in Marathi outfit and Marathi cultures. This irks Shiv's mother and she tries to create hurdles for Gauri. Gauri gets hurt by her actions and return to Mumbai. Later, Shiv comes to Mumbai to get her back to Varanasi. Later, Gauri gets pregnant with Shiv's children. She learns about her twin babies and decides to give one to her sister-in-law as she cannot conceive. Soon, Gauri gives birth to twins and her in-laws accept her and the story ends.

Cast

Main 
 Rishi Saxena as Shivkumar Mataprasad Shukla (Shiv)
 Sayali Sanjeev as Gauri Madhusudan Sawant / Gauri Shivkumar Shukla

Recurring 
Shiv's family
 Shahnawaz Pradhan as Mataprasad Shukla; Shiv's father
 Madhuri Sanjeev as Narmada Mataprasad Shukla; Shiv's mother
 Teyana Ashnita as Sarla Ramkumar Shukla; Ram's wife
 Archana Damohe as Shiv's paternal grandmother
 Dr Akhil Pratap Gautam as Ramkumar Mataprasad Shukla (Ram); Shiv's elder brother
 Bhavya Mishra as Urmila Mataprasad Shukla; Shiv's sister

Gauri's family
 Mohan Joshi as Madhusudan Sawant; Gauri's father
 Shubhangi Gokhale as Sarita Madhusudan Sawant; Gauri's mother
 Shubhangi Joshi as Gauri's maternal grandmother
 Sachin Deshpande as Nachiket Madhusudan Sawant; Gauri's brother
 Neelam Sawant as Nisha Nachiket Sawant; Nachiket's wife

Others
 Mrunal Chemburkar as Nisha's mother
 Sameer Khandekar as Venugopal Kamath (Venu); Shiv's friend
 Nikhil Raut as Vivek (Vicky); Gauri's fiancé
 Karishma Shekhar as Mitali (Mitu); Gauri's friend
 Leena Palekar as Mangesh's mother

Soundtrack
The songs were composed by Samir Saptiskar and lyrics written by Abhijit Gaikwad.

Production 
The series premiered on 28 March 2016 and aired on Zee Marathi from Monday to Saturday at 9 PM by replacing Ka Re Durava. This show always maintain its position in top 5 in BARC.

Special episode

1 hour 
 17 July 2016 
 8 October 2016

2 hours 
 9 October 2016 (Shiv-Gauri's Marriage)

Reception

Ratings

Awards

References

External links 
 Kahe Diya Pardes at ZEE5
 

Marathi-language television shows
2016 Indian television series debuts
Zee Marathi original programming
2017 Indian television series endings